James Reid (born 28 February 1990) is an English footballer who plays primarily as a left-winger.

Career

Nottingham Forest
Born in Nottingham, Nottinghamshire, Reid made his debut for Nottingham Forest after coming on as a 90th-minute substitute in the 1–0 victory over Barnsley in the Championship on 29 November 2008.

Rushden & Diamonds

He joined Rushden & Diamonds on an initial six-month loan on 7 July 2009.

Lincoln City

On 11 March 2010, Reid agreed non-contract terms for Football League Two side Lincoln City.

Non-league

Having not played a game for Lincoln, Reid signed for Hinckley United in August 2010.

On 7 June 2011, Reid signed for AFC Telford United.

In November 2011 he joined Ilkeston on loan

On 31 January 2012 he cancelled his contract with Telford by mutual consent and joined his Ilkeston on a permanent deal until the end of season.

On 17 May 2016 it was announced that Reid had turned down the offer of full-time football with Nuneaton Town to join Gainsborough Trinity.

On 17 March 2017, Basford United announced on their official Facebook page that they had signed Reid from Gainsborough.

On 22 May 2020, it was announced that Reid would return to Ilkeston Town, having turned down an opportunity to extend his contract at Basford.

Career statistics

References

External links

1990 births
Living people
Footballers from Nottingham
English footballers
England youth international footballers
Association football midfielders
Nottingham Forest F.C. players
Rushden & Diamonds F.C. players
Lincoln City F.C. players
Hinckley United F.C. players
AFC Telford United players
English Football League players
Ilkeston F.C. players
Northern Premier League players
Nuneaton Borough F.C. players
Gainsborough Trinity F.C. players
Basford United F.C. players

Ilkeston Town F.C. players